The Amco Cup (subsequently known by various other sponsors' names including the Tooth Cup, KB Cup, National Panasonic Cup and Panasonic Cup) was a mid-week rugby league competition held in Australia between 1974 and 1989. The format was usually a straight knock-out, but various group formats were used between 1979 and 1982. It aired on Channel Ten with Ray Warren and Keith Barnes the commentators for many years. The concept was created by Colin McLennan.

History
Promoter Colin McLennan, who also brought to Australia the jazz legend Benny Goodman and comedians Dudley Moore and Peter Cook, was the man who brought the mid-week Cup to life.
The competition was essentially a "made for TV" event, featuring 4 x 20-minute quarters and a penalty countback rule in the event of a draw. Matches were played under floodlights, usually on a Wednesday evening. Initially Leichhardt Oval in Sydney was the main venue, though later matches were played at Lang Park in Brisbane, Parramatta Stadium and various country centres in New South Wales. The competition was scrapped after the increasingly professional clubs resented the additional burdens on their players caused by the mid-week games. In 1990 it was replaced by a preseason challenge cup played for only by the Sydney Rugby League premiership teams.

Naming rights sponsors
 Amco Cup (1974–79)
 Tooth Cup (1980–81)
 KB Cup (1982–83)
 National Panasonic Cup (1984–87)
 Panasonic Cup (1988–89)

Participating teams

Champions by Year

Most NSWRL Midweek Cup Titles

Cup and Premiership in the Same Season
 Easts in 1975.
 Parramatta in 1986.

See also

City Cup
NSW Challenge Cup
Presidents Cup (Rugby League)
Pre-season Cup
Tooheys Challenge Cup
Challenge Cup
FFA Cup

References

External links

 
Defunct rugby league competitions in Australia
Recurring sporting events established in 1974
1974 establishments in Australia
New South Wales Rugby League premiership
National cup competitions